Pavel Lvovich Gililov (born 23 June 1950) is a Russian classical pianist who has held German citizenship since 2003.

Life 
Born in Donezk, Gililov's musical talent was discovered by the Russian composer Dmitry Kabalevsky. He completed his studies both in piano performance and Lied piano at the Saint Petersburg Conservatory with distinction. While still a student, he won the 1972 Moscow National Piano Competition and was eventually the 4th prize winner of the 1975 International Chopin Piano Competition in Warsaw. He was also a laureate of the International Viotti Piano Competition in Vercelli in 1978.

Gililov emigrated in 1978 from the former Soviet Union first to Austria and finally to Germany.

He performs both as a soloist and as a chamber musician, is a member of the Berlin Philharmonic Piano Quartet and works with numerous well-known soloists such as Boris Pergamenschikow, Mischa Maisky and Viktor Tretiakov. He has appeared at prestigious music festivals, including the Schleswig-Holstein Music Festival, the Salzburg Festival and the Edinburgh Music Festival.

From 1982 until his retirement in 2013, Gililov was professor of piano at the Hochschule für Musik Köln. Since 2007 he has been a professor at the Mozarteum University Salzburg.

He also gives numerous piano master classes in Japan, Germany, Austria and Switzerland, such as the Summer Classics in the Mayen/Koblenz district, of which he was artistic director from 1997 to 2009, or the Summer Academy in Lausanne for violin sonatas with piano together with Pierre Amoyal.

Private life 
Gililov has married three times and has four sons from these marriages. His first wife was the musician Olga Martynova, his second wife the pianist Carmen Daniela, with whom he performed for over two decades and also produced sound and video recordings.

Recordings 
 Johannes Brahms: Sonatas for Violoncello and Piano among others (with Mischa Maisky);
 Johann Nepomuk Hummel: Sonata for Violoncello and Piano (with Boris Pergamenschikow), Flute Trio op.78 (with Andras Adorjan and Boris Pergamenschikow).
 Richard Strauss: Sonata for Violoncello and Piano op.6 and Hans Pfitzner: Sonata for Violoncello and Piano op.1 (with Walter Nothas)
 Sergei Prokofiev: Sonatas for violin and piano among others (with Dmitry Sitkovetsky)
 Frédéric Chopin: Ballades 1–4, Fantasy in F minor, op. 49
 Krzysztof Meyer: Piano Concerto; Trio for Clarinet, Violoncello and Piano (with Eduard Brunner and Ivan Monighetti)

Students 
 Soo Jung Ann
 Birke J. Bertelsmeier
 Oliver Drechsel
 Andreas Frölich
 Alexander Gadjiev
 Peter Adrian Grauer
 Friedrich Höricke
 Ingmar Lazar
 Sophie Pacini
 Olga Scheps
 Christian Seibert
 Henri Sigfridsson
 Annette Volkamer

References

External links 
 
 
 

Russian classical pianists
Academic staff of the Hochschule für Musik und Tanz Köln
Saint Petersburg Conservatory alumni
1950 births
Living people
People from Donetsk, Russia